Acq is a commune in the Pas-de-Calais department in northern France.

Geography
A farming village located 6 miles (9 km) northwest of Arras, by the banks of the Scarpe river, at the D62 and D49 road junction.

Population

Sights
 The church of St.Géry, dating from the sixteenth century.
 The remains of a motte of an ancient castle.
 Two menhirs nearby, known as the 'Stones of Acq'.

See also
 Communes of the Pas-de-Calais department

References

External links

 Acq on the Quid website 

Communes of Pas-de-Calais